The 2015 USA Sevens was the third tournament within the 2014–15 Sevens World Series. It was held over the weekend of 14 – 15 March 2015 at Fifth Third Bank Stadium in the Atlanta suburb of Kennesaw, Georgia.

Format
The teams were drawn into three pools of four teams each. Each team played everyone in their pool one time. The top two teams from each pool advanced to the Cup/Plate brackets while the top 2 third place teams will also compete in the Cup/Plate. The rest of the teams from each group went to the Bowl brackets.

Teams

Pool Stage

Pool A

Pool B

Pool C

Knockout stage

Bowl

Plate

Cup

References

External links
Official website

2015
2014–15 World Rugby Women's Sevens Series
2015 in women's rugby union
2015 in American rugby union
rugby union
2015 rugby sevens competitions